Stephen Wray Wood (born October 6, 1948) was an American politician who served as a Republican member of the North Carolina General Assembly representing the state's sixty-first House district, including constituents in Guilford county. Wood served eight terms in the State House from 1984–2005.

Education
Earned degrees include a BA in history/religion, Asbury University (Wilmore, Kentucky); Th.B in Bible/Theology, John Wesley University, (High Point, NC); MA in History, the University of North Carolina at Greensboro; M.Div., Houston Graduate School of Theology (Houston, Texas);  and D.Min from Luther Rice University (Atlanta, Georgia). Postgraduate studies include Princeton Theological Seminary,
Fuller Theological Seminary, and Earlham School of Religion. He is a member of the academic Phi Alpha Theta International Historical Fraternity.

Before election to the NC House he served as professor of history and education and assistant academic dean at John Wesley College, High Point, North Carolina, (1975-1981). He also served as adjunct professor for Houston Graduate School of Theology and Luther Rice University.

Political career
During his 16-year tenure in the North Carolina State House, Wood was elected Speaker Pro-Tem, 1997–1999, becoming  the second Republican elected to that post during the 20th century. Wood developed a reputation as a fiscal and social conservative sponsoring legislation to reduce the size and scope of government, lower tax burdens, and promote pro-life  issues.

In the Legislature, he became the first Republican Chairman of the House Education Committee in 1995, leading the legislature to establish landmark Charter School legislation and reduce the size of the State Department of Public Instruction bureaucracy by nearly half, as well other educational reform measures including Lateral Entry for Teachers from the military, higher education, business and non-governmental entities,  and the proposal for the first online public school academy.

As part of the Japan Learning Group with the Public School Forum in 1995, Wood traveled to Japan, consulting with educational and political leaders in that country regarding educational reform and school choice.

In 1999, Wood was selected a member of the Oxford International Roundtable on Education convened at Oxford University  presenting a paper on School Choice, Charter Schools and Tax Credits. In 1992, Governor Jim Martin presented Wood the Order of the Longleaf Pine, the highest civilian award given by the state of North Carolina.

Wood is a US Army veteran, (1970–1971). He served as a Veterans Service Officer for the State of North Carolina Division of Veterans Affairs, (1987–1989). He was elected as Vice-Chairman of the Guilford County Republican Party, (1980–1984), and served on the North Carolina Republican Party Executive Committee.

President George W. Bush appointed Wood to the Selective Service Commission in 2001, where he continues to serve.

Other work
He has served as a minister in Quaker (Friends) and United Methodist Churches since 1972. He served on the Board of the Friends Center at Guilford College (1980-1984) and was a founding member of the Triad Christian Counseling Center. (1980, and Preciousl Life Ministries in High Point.  (1982)

Wood is a singer, songwriter, recording artist, public speaker and performer. His original songs include, "I'm On My Way to Heaven," recorded by the Dixie Melody Boys gospel music group. Recording credits include "Love and Devotion", with the Barney Pierce Family; "Travelin Troubadour" (1975); "Titusoverture" (QCA Records/1978); "Sunday Brought The Cure",((TobytowneRecords,2013).

His song, "Sunday Brought the Cure," won the East Coast Songwriters Contest in the Christian Music/Inspirational category (June 2012), 
and is the title song on his 4th album.  He is the Executive Producer and contributor of 8 songs to the CD, "Songs for Santa Isabel" (2015,Tobytowne Records), a compilation album of 22 songs in support of building the Bill Sessoms Memorial Nazarene Church in Santa Isabel, Brazil, in August 2015.  Wood served as Executive Producer of the "Barney Pierce Tribute" album (2019), which included a compilation of  Barney Pierce songs and recorded by various artists over 50 years----including Doyle Lawson and Quicksilver, The Friendly Four, the Gethsemane Quartet and others.

Acting/theater/performing experience includes  an 'extra' in the George Clooney movie, Leatherheads (May 2007);  the role of Burl Sanders in the gospel music comedy, Smoke on the Mountain, produced by the Little Theatre of Winston-Salem, North Carolina, (September 2007); an 'extra' in stock car racing film, Red Dirt Rising (November 2007); role of Ralph Levering in This Tender Place, written by Frank Levering, Cherry Orchard Theater, Cana, VA, (August 2008);
"Tom Dooley," Wilkes Playmakers (2009);  "Moonshine and Thunder:  The Junior Johnson Story," Wilkes Playmakers, (2009); extra in "The Fifth Quarter, (2010); "Dearly Beloved", (Wiley),
2013, Twin City Stage, WS, NC.

Research and writing include book reviews and articles in "Quaker Life", "Piedmont Christian News," Voice of Evangelical Methodism, Journal of the Evangelical Theological Society, "21 Days Devotional", North Carolina Yearly Meeting, September 25, 2013), and biographical entries in the Dictionary of North Carolina Biography (Dr. James Wagner Davis and Rev. Jim H. Green, 1981).

In 2013, Wood was a Co-Founder of Global Missions Group (GMG) an interdenominational non-profit based in North
Carolina, with a mission "to build churches that otherwise would not be built."  GMG's first
project built a church in the village of Santa Isabel, Brazil, in August 2015, on the banks of the Amazon River. GMG's most recent project is a partnership with the missions agency, Ardeo Global to build a new church in Manta, Ecuador, 2016-2017).

References

www.facebook.com/globalmissionsgroup
www.gospelgigs.com/stevewood

"Wood Prepares For Takeover", High Point Enterprise, January 26, 1995, 2A.
"Legislator Likes Rocking the Boat", News Record, Greensboro, NC, May 30, 1995, 1A.
"Group Backing Private School Vouchers Blasts NC Governors", Winston-Salem Journal,
"Amendment Lets Judges Take Positions", "Under the Dome", The News and Observer,
Tuesday, July 18, 1995, 3A.
"Delegation Elects Wood", High Point Enterprise", February 11, 1995, A1.
"Charter Schools and Vouchers Proposed", Greensboro News Record, April 15, 1995, B2.
"North Carolina History Project", Will Schultz, John Locke Foundation Encyclopedia, 2007.
www.LongleafPineSociety.org/roster
Dictionary of North Carolina Biography, (UNC Press), Dr. James W. Davis, Rev. Jim H. Green entries, 1981.
 
Archdale-Trinity News, June 11, 2015, p. 8.
Piedmont Christian News, July 2015.

Asbury University alumni
University of North Carolina at Greensboro alumni
Luther Rice University alumni
Laurel University alumni
Houston Graduate School of Theology alumni
Members of the North Carolina House of Representatives
Living people
21st-century American politicians
1948 births
United States Army soldiers